Bohutín is the name of several locations in the Czech Republic:

 Bohutín (Příbram District), a village in the Central Bohemian Region
 Bohutín (Šumperk District), a village in the Olomouc Region